County Hall is a municipal facility in Tullamore, County Offaly, Ireland.

History
Originally Tullamore Courthouse had been the meeting place of Offaly County Council. The county council moved to modern facilities, which were designed by ABK Architects, in 2002. The new facility won the award for Best Public Building in the Irish Architecture Awards for 2003. The county council have facilitated a series of exhibitions in the new building.

References

Buildings and structures in County Offaly
Tullamore